The 1981 college football season may refer to:

 1981 NCAA Division I-A football season
 1981 NCAA Division I-AA football season
 1981 NCAA Division II football season
 1981 NCAA Division III football season
 1981 NAIA Division I football season
 1981 NAIA Division II football season